Elections to Banbridge District Council were held on 21 May 1997 on the same day as the other Northern Irish local government elections. The election used three district electoral areas to elect a total of 17 councillors.

Election results

Note: "Votes" are the first preference votes.

Districts summary

|- class="unsortable" align="centre"
!rowspan=2 align="left"|Ward
! % 
!Cllrs
! % 
!Cllrs
! %
!Cllrs
! %
!Cllrs
! % 
!Cllrs
!rowspan=2|TotalCllrs
|- class="unsortable" align="center"
!colspan=2 bgcolor="" | UUP
!colspan=2 bgcolor="" | SDLP
!colspan=2 bgcolor="" | DUP
!colspan=2 bgcolor="" | Alliance
!colspan=2 bgcolor="white"| Others
|-
|align="left"|Banbridge Town
|bgcolor="40BFF5"|54.3
|bgcolor="40BFF5"|3
|10.4
|1
|11.3
|1
|8.2
|0
|15.8
|1
|6
|-
|align="left"|Dromore
|bgcolor="40BFF5"|57.8
|bgcolor="40BFF5"|3
|15.4
|1
|16.4
|1
|4.3
|0
|6.1
|0
|5
|-
|align="left"|Knockiveagh
|bgcolor="40BFF5"|43.3
|bgcolor="40BFF5"|3
|26.8
|1
|18.4
|1
|0.0
|0
|11.5
|1
|6
|- class="unsortable" class="sortbottom" style="background:#C9C9C9"
|align="left"| Total
|52.4
|9
|17.9
|3
|15.3
|3
|5.1
|0
|9.3
|2
|17
|-
|}

Districts results

Banbridge Town

1993: 4 x UUP, 1 x SDLP, 1 x Alliance
1997: 3 x UUP, 1 x DUP, 1 x SDLP, 1 x Independent Nationalist
1993-1997 Change: DUP and Independent Nationalist gain from UUP and Alliance

Dromore

1993: 3 x UUP, 1 x DUP, 1 x SDLP
1997: 3 x UUP, 1 x DUP, 1 x SDLP
1993-1997 Change: No change

Knockiveagh

1993: 3 x UUP, 1 x DUP, 1 x SDLP, 1 x Independent Nationalist
1997: 3 x UUP, 1 x DUP, 1 x SDLP, 1 x Independent Nationalist
1993-1997 Change: No change

References

Banbridge District Council elections
Banbridge